lepetitjournal.com is a daily French language news website aimed at French expatriates and Francophones outside France. It was launched in 2001 by Hervé Heyraud, and has won several awards.

Awards
 Prix Michel Colonna d’Istria – GESTE (2005),
 Prix de la Culture nationale de Catalunya (Barcelona, 2008)
 Prix Franco-allemand du journalisme - catégorie Internet (édition Allemagne, 2009

See also
Le Courrier de Floride, a Miami-based French-language newspaper

References

External links
 www.lepetitjournal.com/

French news websites
Publications established in 2001